Walter Phipps may refer to:
 Walter Phipps (rugby union)
 Walter Phipps (cricketer)